Evelyn Ikelau Otto (born March 24, 1989) is a Palauan former swimmer. She swam for Palau at the 2004 Summer Olympics and at the 2003 World Championships.

Otto competed in the women's 50 m freestyle at the 2004 Summer Olympics in Athens, by receiving a Universality place from FINA. Swimming in heat two, she posted a lifetime best of 33.04 to finish fifth and seventieth overall in the prelims.

References

External links
 

1989 births
Living people
Palauan female swimmers
Olympic swimmers of Palau
Swimmers at the 2004 Summer Olympics
Palauan female freestyle swimmers
Sportspeople from Suva
Fijian emigrants to Palau
Fijian people of Palauan descent